Avannaata is a municipality of Greenland created on 1 January 2018 from the bulk of the former Qaasuitsup municipality. It encompasses an area of 522,700 km2 and has 10,726 inhabitants.

Geography
In the south, Avannaata is flanked by the Qeqertalik municipality. In the southeast, it is bordered by the Sermersooq municipality, however this border runs north–south (45° West meridian) through the center of the Greenland ice sheet, and as such is free of traffic. In the east and northeast it is bordered by the Northeast Greenland National Park.

At the southern end of the municipal coastline are the waters of Disko Bay, although some Disko Bay communities belong to the municipality of Qeqertalik. This bay is an inlet of the larger Baffin Bay, which to the north edges into the island of Greenland in the form of Melville Bay. The coastline of northeastern Baffin Bay is dotted with islands of the Upernavik Archipelago, which is entirely contained within the municipality. In the far northwest near Qaanaaq and Siorapaluk, the municipal shores extend into Nares Strait, which separates Greenland from Ellesmere Island.

Avannaata's western side extends to the formerly disputed Hans Island's eastern half, while Canada's Qiqiktaluuk Region  administers the western half.

Politics
Avannaata's municipal council consists of 17 members, elected every four years.

Municipal council

Administrative divisions

Ilulissat area
 Ilulissat (Jakobshavn)
 Ilimanaq (Claushavn)
 Oqaatsut (Rodebay)
 Qeqertaq (Øen)
 Saqqaq (Solsiden)

Qaanaaq area
 Qaanaaq (Thule)
 Qeqertat
 Savissivik
 Siorapaluk

Uummannaq area
 Uummannaq (Omenak)
 Ikerasak
 Illorsuit
 Niaqornat
 Nuugaatsiaq
 Qaarsut
 Saattut
 Ukkusissat

Upernavik area
 Upernavik (Women's Island)
 Aappilattoq
 Innaarsuit
 Kangersuatsiaq
 Kullorsuaq
 Naajaat
 Nutaarmiut
 Nuussuaq (Kraulshavn)
 Tasiusaq
 Tussaaq
 Upernavik Kujalleq (Søndre Upernavik)

Language 

Kalaallisut, the West Greenlandic dialect, is spoken in the towns and settlements of the western and northwestern coasts.  Inuktun is also spoken in and around Qaanaaq.

See also 
 KANUKOKA

References and notes 

 
Ilulissat
Disko Bay
Municipalities of Greenland
Upernavik Archipelago
Uummannaq Fjord
States and territories established in 2018
2018 establishments in Denmark